Hinkleyia is a genus of gastropods belonging to the family Lymnaeidae.

The species of this genus are found in Northern America.

Species:

Hinkleyia caperata 
Hinkleyia pilsbryi

References

Lymnaeidae